Miss Katharine Alexandra Climpson is a minor character in the Lord Peter Wimsey stories by Dorothy L. Sayers. She appears in two novels: Unnatural Death (1927) and Strong Poison (1930), and is mentioned in Gaudy Night (1935) and Busman's Honeymoon (1937).

Plot summary 
Climpson is a spinster who assists Wimsey by doing inquiry and undercover work: Wimsey says she "asks questions which a young man could not put without a blush." In Unnatural Death Climpson is described as "a thin, middle-aged woman, with a sharp, sallow face and very vivacious manner". 

In Strong Poison Climpson now runs an employment agency for women, nicknamed “The Cattery.” She is a member of a jury in Harriet Vane's trial for murder, and holds out against a guilty verdict, creating a hung jury. She is described as having a "militant High-Church conscience of remarkable staying power." In spite of her conscience, she pretends to be a medium and holds a séance in order to obtain information.

In Unnatural Death, another character describes Miss Climpson's religion in these terms:
You might find her up at the church. She often drops in there to say her prayers like. Not a respectful way to approach a place of worship to my mind…Popping in and out on a week-day, the same as if it was a friend’s house. And coming home from Communion as cheerful as anything and ready to laugh and make jokes.

Reception and analysis 
According to Catherine Kenney, "Miss Climpson is one of the brighter and more believable examples of the female sleuth." Other scholars have described her as a character whose modern, earnest and public devotion to Anglicanism drives her morality, a characterization unique in Sayers’ novels. As a spinster who must seek work, Climpson can also be read as representative of certain socioeconomic challenges of interwar Britain, where women were still expected to marry for economic stability; however, Climpson is not belittled or depicted as pathetic, but instead as a resourceful and perceptive woman who has educated herself to keep up with changing socioeconomic realities, while remaining old-fashioned in some respects.

Miss Climpson appears in print two years before Agatha Christie’s famed spinster detective Miss Marple, leading some scholars to see Sayers’ character as an inspiration.

References

Literary characters introduced in 1927
Dorothy L. Sayers characters
Female characters in literature